Mary Bowdoin Page Bird ( – ) was an American poet and novelist.  

She was the daughter of Carter Henry Page and Leila Graham Page and a member of the prominent Page family. In 1892, she married Gilbert Bonham Bird from Berwickshire. They lived in England and later in North Carolina.
  
She wrote poetry and particularly focused on the sonnet form.  She had reportedly written a hundred sonnets by her early twenties.  She published numerous poems in publications, including Lippincott's and Harper's.  In 1894, she published her first novel, Wedded to a Genius, under the pseudonym Neil Christison.  It was  about a woman, Judith, married to a doctor who emotionally abuses her.  She also serialized her work Sir Wilfred in the magazine Things and Thoughts.

Mary Page Bird died in 1924 in London.

Bibliography 

 Wedded to a Genius: A Novel.  2 vol.  London: Bentley, 1894.

References 

  

Created via preloaddraft
1866 births
1924 deaths
American women novelists
American women poets
Page family of Virginia